OOIOO is a Japanese experimental rock band. The four-piece ensemble was founded by Yoshimi P-We (also known as Yoshimio), the drummer and occasional trumpeter for Boredoms. The band's origin lie in a photo shoot that Yoshimi was asked to do for a magazine. She invited a few of her friends to join her, and they created a fake band for the shoot, which they later decided to make real. The band quickly gained attention by being the opening act for Sonic Youth in 1997 on their Japan tour.

According to AllMusic's Kieran McCarthy "It's next to impossible to describe their sound, because — by design — it rarely follows consistent patterns". Some of their music has been described as having "a majestic ebb and flow that suggests natural wonders" or a "witchy, tribal side". Either way, at any one time it may incorporate chanting and punchy drums, dancey polyrhythms atonal composition or psychedelia.

Discography

Albums
OOIOO (1997)
Feather Float (1999)
Gold and Green (2000)
Kila Kila Kila (2003)
Taiga (2006)
Armonico Hewa (2009)
Gamel (2013)
Nijimusi (2019)

EPs
OOEYヨOO -EYヨ REMIX (Eye Remix EP) (2007)

Compilations
Shock City Shockers 2 (2001)
compilation of remixes including mixes by Yamantaka Eye, Kan Takagi, Nobukazu Takemura, and Kiyoshi Izumi; also includes "Open Your Eyes, You Can Fly", a cover of the Chick Corea/Flora Purim jazz fusion song
COCOCOOOIOO: The Best of Shock City 1997–2001 (2004)
highlights from their first three albums, with a remixed track from the Shock City Shockers 2 compilation

Personnel

Current members
 YOSHIMIO - vocals, guitar
 KayaN - guitars, vocals, keyboards
 AyA - bass
 MISHINA - drums

Former members
 Ai — drums
Kyoko — vocals, guitar (died July 19, 2015)
Maki — bass, keyboards
Yoshico — drums (Her real name is Yuka Yoshimura. She is currently a member of CATSUOMATICDEATH, METALCHICKS, and a former member of DMBQ)

Guest musicians
Sean Lennon
Seiichi Yamamoto
Yuka Honda
Yamantaka Eye
Julia Cafritz

References

External links

Thrill Jockey information page

OOIOO at Discogs

Japanese rock music groups
Japanese post-rock groups
Japanese alternative rock groups
Musical groups established in 1995
All-female bands
Thrill Jockey artists
Japanese women in electronic music
1995 establishments in Japan